John Reeves "Catch-'em-alive Jack" Abernathy (January 11, 1876 - January 8, 1941) was an American cowboy, U.S. marshal, and western legend from Bosque County, Texas.

Early life

He was born on January 11, 1876, to Martin Van Buren Abernathy and Kittie Williams in Bosque County, Texas. In 1882 his family moved to Nolan County, Texas, and entered the cattle business. In 1887 at age 11 he worked as a cowboy for the A-K-X Ranch and helped drive a large herd of cattle 500 miles to market at Englewood, Kansas.

Career 

To support his family, Abernathy traveled the country catching wolves and sold them to zoos, circuses, and traveling shows. His traveling show caught the attention of President Theodore Roosevelt, who invited Abernathy to go on a wolf hunt with him and some of his colleagues on a ranch in Oklahoma.  By the end of the wolf hunt, Abernathy and Roosevelt were good friends. Abernathy spent his time catching wolves until he was the age of twenty eight when his friend President Roosevelt appointed Abernathy as the federal U.S. Marshall over the Oklahoma territory in 1906, making him the youngest U.S. Marshal in history. In 1907, his wife passed away leaving Abernathy alone with his children. Abernathy resigned his post of U.S. Marshal in 1910 and moved his family to Wichita Falls, Texas, during the oil boom to become a wildcatter.

Children 

His children included Louis Abernathy and Temple Abernathy, who rode their horses from Oklahoma to New York City to visit their father and meet Theodore Roosevelt. His last born child was Jesse Pearl Abernathy. Her name was changed to Jesse Pearl after her mother died soon after giving birth. Jesse wrote books and moved to California and was a realtor.

Death 

He died in 1941 in Long Beach, California, and was buried in Wichita Falls, Texas.

References

1876 births
1941 deaths
People from Bosque County, Texas
Cowboys
United States Marshals
People from Nolan County, Texas
Legendary American people